Eco-Runner Team Delft is a Delft University of Technology student team, aiming to promote a sustainable future by building the world's most efficient hydrogen-powered car. At the end of the year, the team participates in the Shell Eco-marathon competition in order to assess the efficiency of the vehicle. Eco-Runner Team Delft won the competition in 2015 and 2022. In the competition there are two vehicle classes: Prototype and UrbanConcept. For years Eco-Runner Team Delft participated in the Shell Eco-marathon Prototype class competition where the goal is to cover a certain distance with the least amount of hydrogen. In the year 2019–2020, the team has decided to compete in a different competition; the Urban Concept class. This challenge offers the team the opportunity to design and build an efficient hydrogen-powered vehicle that is closer in appearance to modern city cars.

About the team 
Eco-Runner Team Delft was founded by a handful of technology students in the Netherlands in November 2005. In its first year, the team consisted of eleven second-year students of the Faculty of Aerospace Engineering, Delft University of Technology. Seven of these students were from Belgium and four were Dutch. The team's goal was to compete in the Shell Eco-marathon Prototype class competition on the Rockingham Speedway in the UK in July 2006.

Currently, the team consists of 23 TU Delft students from various faculties. The team consists of 16 full-timers including management, operations departments and technical departments, who stopped their studies for a year, to work on this project. The rest of the team consists of part-timers, who work two days per week on the project. The different departments in the team are each responsible for a certain aspect of the project. Responsibilities of the technical departments include body design, vehicle dynamics, powertrain and strategy. The operations departments is responsible for acquisitions, marketing and events and the management works on planning, organising, leading, and controlling the project.
The team's offices and workshops are located in the D:DREAM Hall on the campus of the Delft University of Technology.

Hereunder, an overview of the different departments and the respective team members is included.

History 
The Eco-Runner project started in 2005 when the team built Eco-Runner 1, an efficient petrol vehicle. The result of second project was the Eco-Runner H2, which was the first hydrogen-powered vehicle. Subsequently, all Eco-Runners were hydrogen-powered.
Most recently the team is working on the Eco-Runner XII which will participate in the on-track competition of the Shell Eco-marathon Urban Concept class for the first time.

Eco-Runner XII 

The Eco-Runner XII is the third Urban Concept car of Eco-Runner Team Delft but the first one to actually participate in this class at the on-track competition of the Shell Eco-marathon. The Eco-Runner XII won the Shell Eco-marathon 2022, which took place at TT Circuit Assen, with an efficiency of 468 km/m^3 which equals to 5407 km/kg. The team improved the electrical systems in the car and reduced the entire power consumption of this system threefolds. Furthermore, the race strategy was optimized to be calculated 25 times faster, allowing for more iterations, and the team implemented a new and improved fuel cell and in wheel electric motor. However, especially the weight of the car was reduced. By making the entire body of the car load-carrying, similar to the concept of a Formula 1 car, the team managed to save a lot of material. Also, many aluminium parts of, for example, the suspension and steering system of the car, were replaced by carbon fibre parts; an even lighter material. This resulted in an overall weight reduction of 41%, improving the overall efficiency.

Eco-Runner XI 

The Eco-Runner XI was the second iteration to participate in the Urban Concept class of the Shell Eco-marathon. The team improved the body of the vehicle in terms of weight and aerodynamics. A teardrop profile of the body accompanied with continuous wheelcaps and a curved bottom plane minimized the turbulance and maximized performance. This resulted in an overall decrease of 48% in aerodynamic drag compared to the previous car. The team further used newly designed aluminum rims, an in-wheel motor and were able to drive as a smart cruise control system, all of which improved the overall efficiency. With this new design the Eco-Runner XI team reached an efficiency of 3396 km/kg hydrogen and won the Hydrogen Efficiency Challenge, a competition organized by the team itself in collaboration with HAN Hydromotive and Green Team Twente as the On-Track competitions of the Shell Eco-marathon were cancelled due to COVID. Additionally the Eco-Runner XI broke the world record for longest distance travelled in a hydrogen vehicle by driving non-stop for 36 hours on one tank load (450 gr) of hydrogen reaching a record distance of exactly 1195.74 kilometers.

Eco-Runner X 

The Eco-Runner X was the first to participate in the Urban Concept class of the Shell Eco-marathon. Therefore, the team developed a completely new design, including headlights, windshield wipers and a luggage compartment, making the design closer to that of a city car. With this new design the Eco-Runner X team won the Vehicle Design Award of the SEM Off-track competition. Unfortunately, due to COVID-19 the On-Track competitions of the SEM were cancelled. That is why the team organized their own on-track competition with HAN Hydromotive and won this race with an efficiency of 2500 km/L hydrogen.

Eco-Runner 9 

In comparison to its predecessors, the Eco-Runner 9 reached a milestone in innovation. The team improved the in-depth neural network to provide the driver with real-time information to optimize the race strategy, made changes to the composite thickness enhancing weight reduction and placed an in-wheel motor to increase efficiency by changing from chain transmission to a direct transmission. The vehicle weighed only 42 kg, a 19% weight reduction compared to the Eco-Runner 8, and was able to claim third place in the SEM Europe. Additionally, they received the vehicle design award.

Eco-Runner 8 

Eco-Runner 8 was the eighth iteration of Eco-Runner Team Delft. It became third in the Shell Eco-marathon prototype class, which took place in London. The team also won the “Vehicle Design” prototype award because of several reasons including its impressive “neural network” which allowed them to effectively communicate with the driver.
The hull of the Eco-Runner 8 was designed by means of wind tunnel tests. This was done in order to analyze the optimal body for the competition.
The vehicle had the electromotor placed in front of the rear wheel so that the vehicle was powered by means of a chain transmission. However, this chain caused a huge total energy loss during the race, which is why the next team decided to design the Eco-Runner 9 with an in-wheel motor to get rid of this energy loss. Furthermore, the Eco-Runner 8 was a bit too much overdesigned, which is why the team became third, and not first, at the end.

Eco-Runner 7 

Eco-Runner 7 is the seventh addition to the Eco-Runner family. It was built in a time frame of 9 months to participate at the Shell Eco-marathon 2017 in London. The track in London is compared to the previous editions of the Shell Eco-marathon very dynamic, consisting of a hill and sharp corners. This makes it very challenging to drive very efficiently.

The Eco-Runner 7 is specially made for the track in London, for which a new concept for the entire powertrain system had to be designed. This was necessary in order to make sure that the Eco-Runner 7 performs at its most efficient point throughout the race. The powertrain system had been altered by implementing an external electric motor which is connected to the wheel with a chain transmission. In addition, the fuel cell has been improved by reducing its weight and increasing its efficiency.

Besides modifying the powertrain system new ways were discovered to reduce the weight of the Eco-Runner. Since every gram counts it is of utmost importance to make the vehicle as light as possible.

Eco-Runner 6 
The newest design vehicle of the Eco-Runner 6 was considered to be the most fuel efficient hydrogen-powered vehicle in the world. The Eco-Runner participated in the Shell Eco-Marathon of 2016 held in London. The major innovations were carried over in the aerodynamic properties to make it best among the world, as the shape was designed in such a way that the extensive aerodynamic CFD analysis could be fully optimised for racing conditions. The application of zigzag strips was used for the delay of the separation point of flow which ultimately led to a better performance in the race. The amalgamation of supercapacitors which are used to serve as a buffer between the fuel cell and the motor and also for inclination as required for London tracks which made it easier to quickly distribute a lot of power to the motor and so the fuel cell could constantly run to its optimal efficiency.

Eco-Runner 5 

The fifth generation of the Eco-Runner participated in the Shell Eco-marathon of 2015 held in Rotterdam. The archetype was named as a one-man vehicle powered by hydrogen fuel cell, becoming a category in the hydrogen class vehicle. The major specifications of the Eco-Runner 5 were carried over by the promising result of the aerodynamic shape. This led to being optimized for a variety of wind directions combined with flow patterns. Having the energy in hydrogen converted to energy in gasoline (liters), this allowed the vehicle to achieve a significant result of 3653 km/L. Furthermore, new aspect was taken into consideration by the team first is the use of front wheel steering mechanism enables the vehicle to achieve a turning radius of just 8 meters.

Eco-Runner 4 
The fourth generation of the Eco-Runner participated in the Shell Eco-marathon of 2014 held in Rotterdam. The prototype is named as a hydrogen class vehicle. The major specification changes in the prototype were done over the energy in hydrogen converted to energy in gasoline (litres), which allowed the vehicle to achieve a significant result of 3524 km/L. Also the weight of the vehicle was around 38 kg and driver weight was 50 kg, which led to a drop in significant results from the previous version of the Eco-Runner to the current version. During the race the average force generated was around 4 newtons, and a nominal power of 35 watts was also achieved.

Eco-Runner 3 

The third generation of the Eco-Runner participated in the Eco-Marathon of 2011. Major improvements over the old vehicle include the aerodynamics and fuel cell efficiency, while the weight of the vehicle has dropped significantly. Almost no parts of the Eco-Runner 3 were off-the-shelf: 95% of all components are of an in-house design or at the very least modified to suit the team's specific needs.

Eco-Runner H2 

The second Eco-Runner is called the Eco-Runner H2. Its main improvement with respect to the first version is its completely integrated design. This results in an extremely aerodynamic shape and a lightweight of the vehicle. On top of that the team is developing two propulsion methods for this new Eco-Runner H2, actually resulting in two Eco-Runners H2.

The first propulsion method comprises a fuel cell driving an electric motor.

The other method is a six-stroke petrol combustion engine. The basic principle of this engine is the same to that of a four-stroke engine but for the injection of a drop of water after the fourth stroke. Due to the extreme heat remaining in the cylinder head, the water will expand rapidly, resulting in a "free" working stroke. The team is aware of this engine's downside, which is the combination of water, high temperature and high pressure, inevitably resulting in a high level of corrosion.

The Eco-Runner H2 participated in the 2007 edition of the Shell Eco-Marathon, where it achieved the Dutch fuel efficiency record of 2282 km/L of petrol using the fuel cell set-up (The hydrogen consumption of the fuel cell is monitored carefully by race officials and then converted to the equivalent of a liter of Shell 95 standard fuel using specific combustion heat of both substances). This was despite a hastily repaired and therefore very poorly working cruise control - a feature essential for keeping all of the components at their point of maximum efficiency. The Eco-Runner H2 holds the Dutch fuel efficiency record to this day.

Eco-Runner 1 

In its first year the Eco-Runner Team Delft built the Eco-Runner 1. This vehicle was built in a limited time and with limited resources, but it nonetheless achieved the team's goal of running 500 kilometers on one liter of petrol. Even with a non-functioning fuel injection system, which was the most important feature of the vehicle, the team was able to achieve 557 kilometers per liter. This achievement encouraged the team to build a new Eco-Runner and participate again with a goal of 2000 kilometers per liter and a top-5 place in the Shell Eco-marathon at the Rockingham speedway.

Results 
The results of the Prototype class are obtained by measuring the amount of hydrogen used per km and converting it to petrol.

The results of the Urban Concept class are presented in the following table.

*1st place in the off-track Vehicle Design Awards and at on-track competition against HAN Hydromotive. There was no on-track SEM competition due to COVID-19.

**There was no on-track SEM competition due to COVID-19. 1st place at the Hydrogen Efficiency Challenge, an on-track competition against Green Team Twente & HAN Hydromotive.

External links 
 

Shell Eco-marathon challengers
Delft University of Technology
Sustainable transport
Concept cars
Vehicle technology